Earlham can refer to the following places:

Earlham, Norfolk, England
Earlham Hall, a historic house in Norfolk, England
Earlham Road, Norwich, England
Earlham, Iowa, United States
Earlham College, a liberal arts college in Richmond, Indiana, United States
Earlham Institute, a research institute in genomics and bioinformatics in Norfolk, England
Earlham Cemetery, a historic cemetery adjacent to Earlham College in Richmond, Indiana, United States